Bellator 288: Nemkov vs. Anderson 2 was a mixed martial arts event produced by Bellator MMA that took place on November 18, 2022, at the Wintrust Arena in Chicago, Illinois, United States.

Background 
The event was headlined by a rematch in the final of the Bellator Light Heavyweight World Grand Prix Tournament for the Bellator Light Heavyweight World Championship between the champion Vadim Nemkov and former title challenger Corey Anderson. The two met earlier in the year at Bellator 277 where the bout ended in a no contest due to an accidental clash of heads at the end of the third round.

A Bellator Lightweight World Championship bout between the champion Patricky Pitbull and undefeated contender Usman Nurmagomedov took place at the event.

A featherweight bout between Daniel Weichel and Akhmed Magomedov was set for this event. However, Magomedov pulled out due to unknown reason and was replaced by Timur Khizriev.

A bantamweight bout between Jaylon Bates and Jornel Lugo was scheduled for this event, however the bout was scrapped the week of the event after Bates pulled out due to unknown reasons.

A featherweight bout between Lucas Brennan and Nick Talavera was set for this event. However, Talavera pulled out due to unknown reason the week of the event and the bout was scrapped.

A featherweight bout between Khasan Askhabov and Otto Rodrigues was scheduled for this event,  however Askhabov did not attempt to weigh in and the bout was scrapped.

Results

See also 

 2022 in Bellator MMA
 List of Bellator MMA events
 List of current Bellator fighters
 Bellator MMA Rankings

References 

Bellator MMA events
2022 in mixed martial arts
Events in Chicago
November 2022 sports events in the United States
2022 in sports in Illinois
Mixed martial arts in Illinois
Sports competitions in Illinois